The Rural Municipality of Morse No. 165 is a rural municipality (RM) in the Canadian province of Saskatchewan within Census Division No. 7 and  Division No. 3. It is located in the southwest portion of the province.

History 
The RM of Morse No. 165 incorporated as a rural municipality on December 11, 1911.

Geography 
Reed Lake is in the RM.

Communities and localities 
The following urban municipalities are surrounded by the RM.

Towns
 Herbert
 Morse

Villages
 Ernfold

The following unincorporated communities are within the RM.

Localities
 Calderbank
 Log Valley
 Glen Kerr
 Gouldtown

Demographics 

Government 
The RM of Morse No. 165 is governed by an elected municipal council and an appointed administrator that meets on the second Tuesday of every month. The reeve of the RM is Bruce Gall while its administrator is Mark Wilson. The RM's office is located in Morse.

References 

M